Bagakhangai (small wooded area) is one of nine düüregs (districts) of the Mongolian capital of Ulaanbaatar. It was established as the home of a Soviet military air base. It is subdivided into two khoroos (subdistricts), #1 khoroo and #2 khoroo.

Districts of Ulaanbaatar
Populated places in Mongolia
Enclaves and exclaves